A Chieftains Celebration is an album by the Irish folk music group, The Chieftains. The title derives from the "celebration" of the millennium of the city of Dublin, Ireland.

Track listing 
 "Coolin Medley" – 4:56
 "O'Mahoney's Frolics" – 3:02
 "Galicia" – 4:38
 "Here's a Health to the Company" – 3:01
 "Planxty Brown/The William Davis's/Lady Wrixon" – 4:46
 "Boffyflow and Spike" – 2:52
 "The Strayaway Child" – 4:55
 "The Iron Man" – 3:40
 "The Wexford Carol" – 3:23
 "Gaftaí Baile Buí" – 4:13
 "Millennium Celtic Suite" – 7:16 - recorded live at Gaiety Theatre, Dublin in July 1988

References 

1989 albums
The Chieftains albums